The name Gaemi has been used to name two tropical cyclones in the northwestern Pacific Ocean. In addition, the variant Kaemi was used in 2000 and 2006 before the spelling was corrected by the WMO Typhoon Committee. The name was submitted by South Korea and is a Korean word (Hangul: 개미, [ˈke̞ːmi]) for ant.

 Tropical Storm Kaemi (2000) (T0011, 19W) – killed four people in Indochina.
 Typhoon Kaemi (2006) (T0605, 06W, Glenda) – struck Taiwan and China.
 Tropical Storm Gaemi (2012) (T1220, 21W, Marce) – became Depression BOB 01, the first storm of the 2012 North Indian Ocean cyclone season.
 Tropical Storm Gaemi (2018) (T1806, 08W, Ester)

Pacific typhoon set index articles